The Association of European Schools of Planning (AESOP) is a network of European universities, their departments and affiliated schools that are engaged in teaching and research in the fields of urban and regional planning.

Foundation 
The formal charter of the establishment of AESOP was signed in Dortmund, Germany in 1987. In 1992, it was formally registered as a non-profit association under Belgian law.

Aims 
The association aims to promote the development of the teaching curricula and research among its member institutions through mutual dialogue, communication, exchange, and dissemination of research practices.

Presidents and Secretary Generals

See also 
 European Spatial Development Perspective
 European Union
 The European Spatial Development Planning network

References

Higher education organisations based in Europe
Organizations established in 1987
Urban planning organizations